The 1998 America East men's basketball tournament was hosted by the Delaware Blue Hens at Bob Carpenter Center. The final was also held at Bob Carpenter Center. Delaware gained its third overall America East Conference Championships and an automatic berth to the NCAA tournament with its win over Boston University. Delaware was given the 15th seed in the Midwest Regional of the NCAA Tournament and lost in the first round to Purdue 95–56.

Bracket and Results

See also
America East Conference

References

America East Conference men's basketball tournament
1997–98 America East Conference men's basketball season
1998 in sports in Delaware
College basketball tournaments in Delaware
Newark, Delaware